Streptomyces puniceus is a bacterium species from the genus of Streptomyces which has been isolated from soil. Streptomyces puniceus produces vinactane and viomycin (viomycin A, viomycin B and viomycin C).

See also 
 List of Streptomyces species

References

Further reading

External links
Type strain of Streptomyces puniceus at BacDive -  the Bacterial Diversity Metadatabase

puniceus
Bacteria described in 1951